The Jianchuan Museum Cluster is located in Anren Town, Dayi County, Sichuan province, China, about one hour's drive from the provincial capital Chengdu. It consists of 26 museums which showcase China's largest private collection of artifacts amassed during the last 60–70 years.

Founding 
The museum was founded by, and named after, Fan Jianchuan (1957), a local real estate billionaire native to Yibin, and a collector of Cultural Revolution Era memorabilia. Before starting his investments in real estate, Fan was the deputy major of Yibin. In 2003 he started investing his real estate earnings in the museums. The first five museums of the cluster opened in 2005. As of 2015 Fan spent the RMB 2 billion on the museums. The cluster started operating break even in 2010.

Exhibits
The complex features more than two million historical and cultural artefacts, mainly from the founder's personal collection, and has been hailed by the Los Angeles Times as an example of "the increasing openness about the way recent history is viewed in China." It has a repository of over 8 million artifacts, with 121 of them classified as Class-One National Treasures. It is the largest museum cluster in China. Several hundred artifacts have also been donated to other museums.

The museums are organized by four major themes: Second Sino-Japanese War (1937–1945), the ‘Red era’, the Wenchuan earthquake, and Chinese folk culture.

Museums

Red Era theme 

 Red Era Ceramics Exhibition Hall
 Red Era Living Necessities Hall
 Long March of the Red Army in Sichuan Memorial Hall
 Zhiqing Life Hall
 AVIC Museum
 Li Zhensheng Photography Museum
 Red Chronicles Exhibition Hall
 Red Era Mirrors Museum

Second-Sino Japanese War theme 

 Unyielding Prisoners of War Museum, about the Sino-Japanese conflict between 1931 and 1945
 Hall of the Frontal Battlefield, dedicated to the Kuomintang efforts in fighting the Japanese
 Hall of the Conventional Battlefront
 Hall of Unyielding Chinese Prisoners of War
 Hall of the Heroes of the Flying Tigers
 Exhibition of Weapons for Homeland Security
 Sichuan Army Anti-Japanese Museum
 Museum of Japanese Aggression Against China
 Chinese Warriors Group Culture Plaza
 China Anti-Japanese Veterans Handprints Plaza
 Foreign Volunteer Supporters of China Plaza
 Evidence of the Japanese War Crime, opened on the 70th anniversary of China's victory against the Japanese

Wenchuan Earthquake theme 

 Memorial Hall of the 5.12 Earthquake 
 Wenchuan Earthquake Museum, exhibiting object left damaged by the earthquake
 Earthquake Art Gallery
 Hu Huishan Memorial Hall, in memory of Hu Huishan, a female student of Dujiangyan High School,who died of the earthquake

Chinese folk culture theme 

 The Memorial Hall of Yangtze River Rafting
 Old Mansion Furniture Exhibition Hall
 Three-inch Golden Lotus Cultural Relics Gallery
 National Defense Weapons Museum
 Liu Wenhui Former Residence Exhibition Hall

Other 

 Jianchuan Art Exhibition Hall
 Reform and opening heroes plaza

Gallery

See also
 List of museums in China

World War II museums in China
Museums in Sichuan
History museums in China
Museums established in 2005

References